William Andrew Charlton,  (May 9, 1841 – November 9, 1930) was a Canadian lumber merchant, businessman and politician.

Born in Cattaraugus County, New York, the son of Adam Charlton, he immigrated to Canada in 1849 with his family. In 1869, he married Nellie Rockwell. Charlton entered politics and was first elected to the Ontario legislature as the Liberal Member of the Legislative Assembly for Norfolk South in the 1890 general election and served until 1904.

He served as Speaker of the Legislative Assembly of Ontario in 1903-1904 and was Commissioner of Public Works from 1904 until 1905.

Charlton moved to federal politics and won a seat in the House of Commons of Canada as the federal Liberal Member of Parliament for Norfolk in the 1911 federal election. During the Conscription Crisis of 1917, he supported the government of Sir Robert Borden and crossed the floor to run in the 1917 federal election as a Liberal-Unionist in support of Borden's new Union government defeating Laurier-Liberal candidate John Alexander Wallace.

In 1921, he was named to the Queen's Privy Council for Canada.

His brother, John M. Charlton, also served in the House of Commons.

References

External links
 

 
The Canadian parliamentary companion, 1897 JA Gemmill

1841 births
1930 deaths
Speakers of the Legislative Assembly of Ontario
Ontario Liberal Party MPPs
Members of the House of Commons of Canada from Ontario
Liberal Party of Canada MPs
Liberal-Unionist MPs in Canada
Members of the King's Privy Council for Canada